Confessions of a Superhero is a 2007 American documentary film directed by Matthew Ogens about costumed superheroes on the Hollywood Walk of Fame. The film focuses in particular on Christopher Dennis, Jennifer Wenger, Joseph McQueen, and Maxwell Allen, who dress as Superman, Wonder Woman, the Hulk, and Batman, respectively.

The film tells the life story of its four main subjects, all aspiring actors who have very different backgrounds. Dennis grew up in Los Angeles as an orphan, but claims to be the son of Oscar and Tony winning actress Sandy Dennis, though Sandy Dennis's family denies that she had any children. Wenger was a small-town cheerleader before moving to Hollywood to become an actress. McQueen moved to Los Angeles during the Rodney King riots and was homeless for four years before becoming the Hulk, and achieves the most success of any of the subjects in the film, winning a small role in Justin Lin's Finishing the Game. Allen claims to be a former mobster with a murderous past, though his wife casts doubts on his stories in the film.

Reception
The film was well received by critics, and was an official selection at the 2007 SXSW film festival, and an official selection at the AFI fest. The review aggregator website Rotten Tomatoes surveyed  and, categorizing the reviews as positive or negative, assessed all eleven as positive for a 100 percent rating. Among the reviews, it determined an average rating of 7.70 out of 10.

References

External links
 
 
 

2007 films
Documentary films about actors
2007 documentary films
American documentary films
Documentary films about comics
American superhero films
Films directed by Matthew Ogens
2000s English-language films
2000s American films